The Canadian Congress of Labour (CCL) was founded in 1940 and merged with Trades and Labour Congress of Canada (TLC) to form the Canadian Labour Congress (CLC) in 1956.

Founding
In 1939, the Congress of Industrial Organizations (CIO) supporters were expelled from the TLC, due to the demands of the American-based American Federation of Labor (AFL). This split had to do with the CIO unionizing industrial trades, and the AFL organizing  craft trades. The expelled unions included the Steel Workers Organizing Committee, now called the United Steelworkers (USW); United Auto Workers of America, now Unifor; and the  United Mine Workers (UMWA).  They negotiated with the All-Canadian Congress of Labour and founded the Canadian Congress of Labour in 1940 to rival the TLC. At its founding, it had 100,000 members, and grew to 250,000 by 1943.

The Congress' founding executive included  Aaron Mosher (Canadian Brotherhood of Railway Employees), Silby Barrett, Sol Spivak, and Charles Millard (Steelworkers). They were all members of the social democratic Co-operative Commonwealth Federation (CCF) political party. They were united in the belief that labour should be involved in politics.

In 1981 a postage stamp, depicting Mosher flanked by two railway workers, was issued to commemorate the centenary of Mosher's birth.

Leadership

Presidents
1940: Aaron Mosher

Secretary-Treasurers
1941: Pat Conroy
1951: Donald MacDonald

Notes

References

Congress of Industrial Organizations
Canadian Labour Congress
Economic history of Canada
Trade unions established in 1940
Trade unions disestablished in 1956
1940 establishments in Canada
1956 disestablishments in Canada
National federations of trade unions